KEVC-CD (channel 5) is a low-power, Class A television station licensed to Indio, California, United States, serving the Coachella Valley as an affiliate of the Spanish-language UniMás network. It is owned by Entravision Communications alongside Univision affiliate KVER-CD (channel 41, also licensed to Indio), Palm Springs–licensed NBC affiliate KMIR-TV (channel 36) and MyNetworkTV affiliate KPSE-LD (channel 50). KEVC and KVER share studios on Corporate Way in Palm Desert; KMIR and KPSE maintain separate facilities on Parkview Drive, also in Palm Desert. KEVC's transmitter is located atop Edom Hill in Cathedral City.

Subchannels
The station's digital signal is multiplexed:

References

External links
Entravision Communications

EVC-CD
Indio, California
Low-power television stations in the United States
EVC-CD
UniMás network affiliates
TBD (TV network) affiliates
Comet (TV network) affiliates
Charge! (TV network) affiliates
Television channels and stations established in 1999
1999 establishments in California